Chatterbox may refer to:

In music 
 Chatterbox (band), an American industrial music band
 Chatterbox Records, an Australian-based record label
 Chatterbox (album), a 1990 demo for the band Toadies

In print 
 Chatterbox, a political column written by Timothy Noah
 Chatterbox, a children's weekly paper founded in 1866 by John Erskine Clarke
 Chatterbox, a games forum published daily in the Guardian newspaper

In computers 
 Chatterbot or chatterbox, a computer bot which attempts to maintain a conversation with a person
 A shoutbox, a website feature that allows people to quickly leave messages on said website

In food and drink 
 Chatterbox (restaurant), a restaurant in Singapore

In movies and television 
 Chatterbox (1936 film), starring Anne Shirley
 Chatterbox (1943 film), starring Joe E. Brown
 Chatterbox (1977 film), a comedy film about a woman with a talking vagina
 Chatterbox (1993 film), a film by Liu Miaomiao
 Chatterbox, a puppet on the Hi-5 TV series (Australia, America, United Kingdom, Philippines and Indonesia)
 "The Chatterbox", a season 2 episode from the American TV series The Nanny

Characters
 Mr. Chatterbox, in the Mr. Men children's book series
 Little Miss Chatterbox, in the Little Miss children's book series
 Chatterbox, a member of the fictional disaster squad Ro-Busters
 Chatterbox, a puppet who appears with Australian children's musical group Hi-5

Other uses 
 Chatterbox Falls, a waterfall in Princess Louisa Inlet, British Columbia, Canada
 Paper fortune teller, an origami also called a "chatterbox"
 Chatterbox FM, a fictional talk radio station in the video game series Grand Theft Auto
 "Chatterbox", informal term for a talkative person, sometimes a compulsive talker